Rafy Mercenario is a Puerto Rican reggaeton producer. He has produced hits for several artists including Daddy Yankee, Don Omar and Ivy Queen. He has released compilation albums, including a collaboration with fellow producer DJ Nelson, The Kings of the Remix (2006), which debuted at number fourteen on the Billboard Latin Rhythm Albums chart.

Musical career
In 2005, Mercenario produced the four new studio tracks on Puerto Rican singer Ivy Queen's fifth studio/compilation release Flashback. At this time, he had become "the most highly requested producer in reggaetón". The tracks included the lead single "Cuentale" and the second single "Libertad", which peaked at number three and thirteen, respectively on the Billboard Latin Songs chart.

Discography
Adapted from Allmusic:

Compilation albums
 2003: Kakoteo Mix (with DJ Nelson)
 2005: Digital Reggaeton Pistas
 2005: Reggaeton Beats, Vol. 1 
 2006: No Mercy
 2006: The Kings of the Remix (with DJ Nelson)
 2006: Mundo Demente

Production discography

 2002: A Mover (DJ Joe)
 2003: Sandungueo.com: Reggaeton Hits, Vol. 1 (Various Artists)
 2003: Pina... the Company: Los Mas Duros (Various Artists)
 2003: La Confrontacion (Various Artists)
 2003: Innovando (DJ Anqueira)
 2003: Fuera de Serie (Lito & Polaco)
 2003: Conspiracion, Vol. 2: La Secuela (Various Artists)
 2004: Diva Platinum Edition (Ivy Queen)
 2004: 12 Discípulos (Eddie Dee)
 2004: Vida Escante (Nicky Jam)
 2004: The Noise, Vol. 10: The Last Noise (The Noise)
 2004: Sabotage (Master Joe & O.G. Black)
 2004: Reggaeton Mixtape, Vol. 1 (Various Artists)
 2004: Real (Ivy Queen)
 2004: Motivando a la Yal (Zion & Lennox)
 2004: Los Narcomujeriegos (Various Artists)
 2004: La Pelicula (Various Artists)
 2004: Jamz TV Hits, Vol. 2 (Various Artists)
 2004: Guatuaba Mixtape (Various Artists)
 2004: Guatuaba Mixtape, Vol. 2 (Various Artists)
 2004: Flow la Discoteka (DJ Nelson)
 2004: Evolucion Arrestada (Mikey Perfecto)
 2004: Entrando Al Juego (Trivales)
 2004: El Que Habla Con Las Manos (Eliel)
 2004: Contra La Corriente (Noriega)
 2004: Chosen Few II: El Documental'' (Boy Wonder)

References

Reggaeton record producers